Hubert Charpentier (born October 14, 1982) is a French professional football player. Currently, he plays in the Championnat de France amateur for Jura Sud Lavans.

He played on the professional level in Ligue 2 for Stade Reims.

1982 births
Living people
French footballers
Ligue 2 players
Stade de Reims players
Calais RUFC players
Jura Sud Foot players
Olympique Saint-Quentin players
Entente Feignies Aulnoye FC players
Association football goalkeepers